Torp's Cabinet governed Norway between 19 November 1951 and 22 January 1955. The Labour Party cabinet was led by Oscar Torp. The cabinet was succeeded by Einar Gerhardsen's third cabinet after the Labour Party wanted to swap prime minister.

Cabinet members

|}

Notes

References

Torp
Torp
1951 establishments in Norway
1955 disestablishments in Norway
Cabinets established in 1951
Cabinets disestablished in 1955